El Sexo Débil is a Mexican Spanish language telenovela produced by Argos Television for Cadena Tres and Sony Pictures Television for Cadena Tres. It stars Itatí Cantoral, Mauricio Ochmann, Khotan Fernández, Raúl Méndez, Pablo Cruz and Arturo Ríos. The series-made-telenovela was aired on 7 February 2011.

As of November 24, 2014 Canal 7 started broadcasting El Sexo Débil weekdays at 2:30pm replacing Sangre Que Traiciona. The last episode was broadcast on February 13, 2015 with Las Trampas del Deseo replacing it on February 16, 2015.

Cast
Itatí Cantoral Helena Román
Mauricio Ochmann Julián Camacho
Khotan Fernández Alvaro Camacho
Pablo Cruz Bruno Camacho
Raúl Méndez
Marco Trevino
Adriana Parra
Rodrigo Oviedo
Luciana Silveyra
Bianca Calderon
Adrián Alonso
Julia Urbini
Arturo Ríos

References

2011 Mexican television series debuts
Argos Comunicación telenovelas